The 1990 Intercontinental Final was the sixteenth running of the Intercontinental Final as part of the qualification for the 1990 Speedway World Championship. The 1990 Final was run on 12 August at the Hele Fyns Speedway Center in Fjelsted, Denmark, and was the last qualifying stage for riders from Scandinavia, the USA and from the Commonwealth nations for the World Final to be held at the Odsal Stadium in Bradford, England.

Intercontinental Final
 12 August
  Fjelsted, Hele Fyns Speedway Center
 Qualification: Top 11 plus 1 reserve to the World Final in Bradford, England

* Richard Knight replaced the injured Simon Cross

References

See also
 Motorcycle Speedway

1990
World Individual